Éric André Joly (born 6 October 1972) is a French retired professional football player.

References

1972 births
Living people
French footballers
French expatriate footballers
Expatriate footballers in Belgium
Belgian Pro League players
OGC Nice players
Pau FC players
USF Fécamp players
FC Rouen players
K.V. Kortrijk players
K.A.A. Gent players
S.C. Eendracht Aalst players
R.A.E.C. Mons players
Kilmarnock F.C. players
K.V. Oostende players
K.S.V. Roeselare players
R.R.C. Peruwelz players
Expatriate footballers in Scotland
Scottish Premier League players
Association football midfielders